The Bravest Knight is a 2D animated series, produced by Big Bad Boo Studios and a Hulu original which became the first kids original on the streaming service. The first episodes were added to the streaming service on June 21, 2019 and the other eight on October 11, 2019. The show, which was created by Daniel Errico, and directed by Shabnam Rezaei. It is a fantasy and adventure story focused on how a young kid and pumpkin farmer turned into the "bravest knight" through wild adventures across the lands, which he tells his adopted daughter. The series is one of the first all-ages animations to have an "openly gay main character."

Premise
Cedric, formerly a pumpkin farmer and now married to a prince named Andrew, tells the story of how he became the "greatest knight" to his 10-year-old adopted daughter, Nia. 

In an attempt to get Nia, a not-yet-knight, to learn from his example, he recounts the challenges he encountered along the way, accompanied by his friend Grunt. Nia, in the process, learns how to be her "best self" and that being a knight is more than just slaying dragons.

Promotion, production, and release
The show is based on Errico's novel The Bravest Knight Who Ever Lived and a short animation which premiered in 2015 of the same name.

Shabnam Rezaei, who founded Big Bad Boo Studios with her husband Aly Jetha, was the producer of the series. Rezaei later said that it has been a "pleasure to work alongside Hulu." She also said that the show is teaching life lessons and called it an "adventure about how to be a great knight" and how to be a good person. She also remained confident the show would air in Canada, parts of Western Europe, the UK, and Australia. The show itself was greenlit by Hulu in November 2017 and went into production in early 2018, with "approximately 120 people working on the show," with Errico and Randy Rogel writing the stories for each episode, with the animation done in Vancouver. The show was supervised by Eddie Soriano, while Paddy Gillen was VP of production, and Benjie Randall was the casting director. The show's biggest challenge was, as Rezaei admitted, the budget, in trying to cast big-name stars like RuPaul and Wanda Sykes.

Apart from this, Enrico, in a September 2019 interview, said that he was inspired to create the character after reading fairytales and trying to create "multi-dimensional protagonists who also happened to be gay," but stated that it was not a sure thing that Hulu would take the series. He also said that while he hasn't had the opportunity of working with many other writers, he realizes that as a white and cisgender man, that "fair access to opportunities in family entertainment demands a dedication to change," with the necessity of working with "creative writers of color." Furthermore, he said that each episode has a lesson, and to touch on themes like self-confidence, forgiveness, and a message of "being yourself and being true to yourself." Elsewhere he stated the importance of "giving children more role models, more diverse examples or heroes" and noted that most networks he approached with the story were "resistant to having an LGBTQ protagonist," but Hulu gave the show a green light.

Characters

Main
  (voiced by T. R. Knight (older) and Chance Hurstfield  (younger)) is a knight and husband of Prince Andrew, who is the father of Nia, their adopted daughter. He is friends with Grunt and a raven named Saylor. 
  (voiced by Bobby Moynihan) is a troll who is a friend and traveling companion of Cedric when he was a not-yet-knight.
  (voiced by Storm Reid) is the adopted 10-year-old daughter of Sir Cedric and Prince Andrew.

Supporting
  (voiced by Wilson Cruz) is a prince, husband of Sir Cedric, and father of Nia.
  (voiced by Steven Weber) is the head of the Knights Declarant and dismissive of help from others, like Grunt, Cedric, and Saylor, leading them to believe that he won't help them in future quests.
  (voiced by Teri Polo) is a messenger raven who travels with Cedric and Grunt in their journeys. She is also a friend of Nia, Andrew, Cedric, and Grunt.
  (voiced by Shannon Chan-Kent) is a magical talking flute which helps Cedric and his friends on their quest.

Other characters
  (voiced by Christine Baranski) is the dragon that is menacing the kingdom when Cedric is a not-yet knight.
  (voiced by Emilio Delgado) is the king of the kingdom when Cedric is a not-yet knight.
  (voiced by Adriana Sananes) is the queen of the kingdom when Cedric is a not-yet knight.
  (voiced by Rebecca Husain) is a green troll they meet at a jousting competition.
Eyame The Green Leaf (voiced by Storm Reid) is a jousting competitor of Cedric and also a not-yet-knight.
  (voiced by Kathleen Barr) is a yeti which menaces Cedric and Grunt, and ends up being the mother of the Itty Bitty Yeti.
  (voiced by Kyle Rideout) is a yeti which is the child of the Big Yeti. 
  (voiced by Brian Drummond) is a huge giant that greedily captures Cedric and Grunt. 
  (voiced by Paul Sun-Hyung Lee) is a person who makes a potion that tells a prophecy of Cedric and Grunt's future.
  (voiced by RuPaul) is a misunderstood wolf that blows down the houses in Bricktown before Cedric and his friends put a stop to him, who crossdresses in women's clothing.
  (voiced by Julie Nathanson) is a sheep terrified of the wolf blowing down the houses in Bricktown. Nathansan called Francine "one of the funniest characters" she had ever voiced.
  (voiced by Benjie Randall) is the mayor of Bricktown, who renamed the town in a failed effort to deter the wolf.
  (voiced by Wanda Sykes) is the mayor, librarian, music coordinator, and much more in a place known as Quiet Town.
  (voiced by Brian Drummond) is a mean-tempered troll which the dragon released from Fairy Jail, stole Grunt's bridge, and kicked him out of his home. 
  (voiced by Jazz Jennings) is a magical fairy that Cedric and Grunt save from a downpour. She is the daughter of another fairy named Lucy.
  (voiced by AJ McLean) is a magical fairy who is the father of Lily, and uses fairy dust to steal Grunt's grapes. 
  (voiced by Donna Murphy) is an evil witch who fights Cedric, Grunt, and Saylor.

Episodes

Reception
The series was positively received. GLAAD's chief communications officer, Rich Ferraro, praised the series as bringing "important lessons about diversity and acceptance to young audiences," giving children with gay parents an "animated family that they can relate to and applaud." Curtis M. Wong of HuffPost called the series "forward-thinking" and "LGBTQ-inclusive." Jamie Sugah of The Geekiary was also supportive, saying that the show will "join the ranks of children's programming that has featured openly LGBTQ+ characters" and applauded Hulu, and platforms like Netflix for "creating this sort of content for children" which features "an interracial gay couple and their daughter." In contrast, Lapacazo Sandoval in the Los Angeles Sentinel criticized the series for "coloring in a Black or Brown character" in the series, since the creator is a White man, rather than someone from the Black community, even as he called it a "good show." Similarly, James Michael Nichols of HuffPost said that the series helps make the representation of "the whole spectrum of human love and experience" a reality and Brian T. Carney of the Washington Blade described the series as family-friendly, having a terrific voice cast, along with lively and colorful animation, and presenting "issues of diversity in an age-appropriate and matter-of-fact manner." Additionally, Joyce Slaton of Common Sense Media stated that there are "stellar messages" in the series, with a "same-sex relationship at the emotional heart of the story," toned down violence, with hories often using their wits to "escape dangerous situations than to physically fight." Slayton also remarked that the "gentle messages" of the series are "easy to love."

The show was praised for being "groundbreaking" because it features a household of two dads (Cedic and Andrew), making it one of the first all-ages animations to have an "openly gay main character." Justin Tranter, a board member of GLAAD, composed the opening theme song of the series. The series also generated considerable debate, with a "fierce battle" on the show's Facebook page between those who defended it and critics from the religious right who criticized it. The series later won the MIPCOM Diversify TV Excellence award in kids’ programming at the MIPCOM Diversify TV Excellence awards in October 2019.

See also
 Gay bashing
 Gay village
 List of animated series with LGBTQ characters
 List of lesbian, gay, bisexual or transgender-related films

Notes

References

External links

 Official website
 Official production website
 Exclusive Interview with The Bravest Knight Cast

2010s American animated television series
2010s American LGBT-related animated television series
2010s Canadian animated television series
2019 American television series debuts
2019 American television series endings
2019 Canadian television series debuts
2019 Canadian television series endings
American children's animated adventure television series
American children's animated fantasy television series
Animated television series about children
Canadian children's animated adventure television series
Canadian children's animated fantasy television series
English-language television shows
Gay-related television shows
Hulu children's programming
Hulu original programming
LGBT speculative fiction television series
Television series by 20th Century Fox Television
CBC Kids original programming